Aimee Canny (born 21 November 2003) is a South African swimmer. She competed in the women's 4 × 200 metre freestyle relay at the 2020 Summer Olympics.

2022–2023
In April 2022, at the 2022 South Africa National Swimming Championships, Canny swam a 2022 World Aquatics Championships qualifying time of 1:58.34 in the 200 metre freestyle in the final to win the gold medal. She was named to the South Africa team in swimming at the 2022 Commonwealth Games in June.

At the 2022 Commonwealth Games, held in Birmingham, England starting in July, Canny placed ninth in the 200 metre freestyle with a time of 2:00.10. The following day, she helped achieve a fourth-place finish in the 4×100 metre freestyle relay in 3:40.31, swimming the lead-off leg of the relay in 54.84 seconds. Day three, she led-off the 4×200 metre freestyle relay with a 1:58.72 to contribute to a final time of 8:02.28 and a fourth-place finish. She followed up her fourth-place finish with a fourth-ranked time of 55.27 seconds in the preliminaries of the 100 metre freestyle the following morning, qualifying for the semifinals. Lowering her time to 54.78 in the semifinals, she qualified for the final ranking sixth. With a time of 54.88 seconds in the final on day five, she placed sixth. Later in the session, she anchored the 4×100 metre mixed medley relay in the final, helping place fourth in a time of 3:44.38, which was a new African record and South African record. She helped set new African and South African records in the final of the 4×100 metre medley relay as well, contributing to a fourth-place finish in a time of 3:59.63 by splitting a 53.80 for the freestyle portion of the relay.

First collegiate season
At the first meet of her collegiate career, a dual meet against the Virginia Tech Hokies in January 2023, Canny won the 200 yard freestyle for her team, the Virginia Cavaliers, contributing to an overall victory for the Cavaliers. The following month, she achieved another win in the 200 yard freestyle, this time at the 2023 Cavalier Invitational, with a pool record and personal best time of 1:42.78 and helped achieve a 1-2 finish with her teammate Gretchen Walsh.

Starting competition on day one of the 2023 Atlantic Coast Conference Championships, 14 February, Canny split the fastest time of all relay swimmers in the women's 4×200 yard freestyle relay with a 1:42.79 for the second leg to contribute to a conference title-winning time of 6:55.15. The following day, she won the b-final of the 200 yard individual medley with a personal best time of 1:55.90. For her third event, the 200 yard freestyle on day three, she placed second in the final with a personal best time of 1:42.62. The next evening, she helped set new US Open and NCAA records in the 4×100 yard medley relay, swimming the freestyle leg to contribute to the winning time of 3:21.80. In her final event of the Championships, she finished in a time of 48.16 seconds in the final of the 100 yard freestyle to place seventh, which followed a personal best time of 48.05 seconds in the morning preliminaries.

The following month, on day one of the 2023 NCAA Division I Championships, Canny led-off the 4×200 yard freestyle relay with a personal best time of 1:42.34 to contribute to an NCAA title-winning and pool record time of 6:49.82. Day two, she placed nineteenth in the 200 yard individual medley with a time of 1:56.10. In the 200 yard freestyle on day three, she won the bronze medal with a time of 1:42.50. She won her second NCAA title later in the day in the 4×100 yard medley relay, where she swam the freestyle leg of the relay in 47.27 seconds to help finish in a new pool record time of 3:22.39. On the final day, she started off with a personal best time of 47.98 seconds in the morning preliminaries of the 100 yard freestyle before placing fourteenth overall, sixth in the evening b-final (consolation final), with a time of 48.10 seconds.

Personal best times

Short course yards (25 yd pool)

Legend: h – preliminary heat; b – b-final; r – relay 1st leg

References

External links
 

2003 births
Living people
South African female swimmers
South African female freestyle swimmers
Olympic swimmers of South Africa
Swimmers at the 2020 Summer Olympics
Place of birth missing (living people)
21st-century South African women
Swimmers at the 2022 Commonwealth Games
Commonwealth Games competitors for South Africa